Eloise is a 2016 American thriller film directed by Robert Legato and written by Christopher Borrelli. The film stars Eliza Dushku, Robert Patrick, Chace Crawford, Brandon T. Jackson, Nicole Forester, and P. J. Byrne. The film was released on February 3, 2017, by Vertical Entertainment.

Cast
 Eliza Dushku as Pia Carter		
 Robert Patrick Dr. H. H. Greiss
 Chace Crawford as Jacob Martin
 Brandon T. Jackson as Dell Richards		
 Nicole Forester Genevieve Martin
 P. J. Byrne as Scott Carter	
 Ricky Wayne as Detective Frazier

Production
On April 25, 2014, Chace Crawford, Eliza Dushku, Brandon T. Jackson and P. J. Byrne joined the cast. Principal photography began on May 5, 2014.

It was shot in and around Metropolitan Detroit, and was financed in part by a $2 million Michigan film incentive subsidy from the State of Michigan.  Much of it was filmed at Eloise.

Release
The film was released on February 3, 2017, by Vertical Entertainment.

Critical reception
Critic John DeFore of The Hollywood Reporter wrote that it is "An incoherent, time-hopping paranormal tale."  It offered condolences to the actual staff of Eloise.

The New York Times declared it, "A horror movie of such ineptitude that it invites sympathy for even its least gifted participants."

Variety was dismissive: "A notorious former insane asylum turns out — surprise! — to be a bad place to visit in this generic horror opus.  Reasonably slick but empty, 'Eloise' is no Session 9 as far as haunted-former-mental-hospital horrors go. Heck, it's not even a Grave Encounters 2."

The Village Voice said it all in the title of its article.

Rotten Tomatoes gave it an 11% rating. On Metacritic it has a score of 15% based on reviews from 6 critics, indicating "overwhelming dislike".

References

Notes

Citations

External links
 

2016 films
American psychological thriller films
2016 psychological thriller films
2010s English-language films
2010s American films